Waite Islands is a group of small islands in the Amundsen Sea, lying  west of Cape Waite, the northwest extremity of King Peninsula. Mapped by United States Geological Survey (USGS) from surveys and U.S. Navy air photos, 1960–66. Named by Advisory Committee on Antarctic Names (US-ACAN) for their proximity to Cape Waite.

See also 
 List of Antarctic and sub-Antarctic islands

Islands of Ellsworth Land